The 2011 Canadian Wheelchair Curling Championship was held March 21-27 at the Jasper Place Curling Club in Edmonton, Alberta.

Manitoba won their first Canadian Wheelchair Curling Championship, defeating Alberta in the final.

Teams

Standings
Final round-robin standings

Playoffs

1 vs 2

3 vs 4

Semifinal

Final

External links

Sport in Edmonton
Canadian Wheelchair Curling Championship
Wheelchair Curling Championship
Curling in Alberta
Canadian Wheelchair Curling Championships
Wheelchair Curling Championship